Kala Chitta National Park is a national park located in the Attock District, Pakistan.

The park is part of the Kala Chitta Range, in the Pothohar Plateau. The park covers an area of approximately 16,948 hectares.

References

National parks of Pakistan
Attock District
Protected areas of Punjab, Pakistan